Víctor or Victor Santos may refer to:

 Víctor Santos (baseball) (born 1976), Dominican professional baseball pitcher
 Víctor Santos (author) (born 1977), cartoonist and screenwriter of Valencian comics
 Victor Santos (football official) (born 1953), Andorran football official
 Victor Santos (skier) (born 1997), Brazilian cross-country skier

See also
 Vítor Santos (born 1958), Portuguese footballer